Alloclemensia devotella is a moth of the  family Incurvariidae. It was described by Rebel in 1893. It is found in the Caucasus.

References

Moths described in 1893
Incurvariidae
Moths of Asia